Sydney Chilton Mewburn,  (December 4, 1863 – August 11, 1956) was a Canadian lawyer, soldier, and politician.

Born in Hamilton, Canada West, he was the  Minister of Militia and Defence from October 12, 1917, to January 15, 1920, under Sir Robert Borden's Union Government in 1917. Mewburn was Commanding Officer (Colonel) of the Royal Hamilton Light Infantry (13th Royal Regiment as of 1910) and served during World War I, he was a Major General (and Adjutant-General) in the Canadian Army before his appointment as Minister of Militia in October 1917.

He was later the Chair of the 1920 Canadian Battlefields Memorials Commission, which selected the site for the Vimy Memorial.

References

External links

1863 births
1956 deaths
Canadian generals
Lawyers in Ontario
Canadian people of World War I
Conservative Party of Canada (1867–1942) MPs
Members of the House of Commons of Canada from Ontario
Members of the King's Privy Council for Canada
Politicians from Hamilton, Ontario
Canadian military personnel from Ontario
Canadian generals of World War I